At a national level, Slovenia elects a head of state (a president) and a legislature. The president is elected for a five-year term by the people using the run-off system. The National Assembly (Državni zbor), Slovenia's parliament, has 90 members each elected for four-year terms. All but two of these are elected using the D'Hondt method of list proportional representation. The remaining two members are elected by the Italian and Hungarian ethnic minorities using the Borda count.

Slovenia's multi-party system means that any one party is unlikely to gain power alone. Coalition governments must therefore be negotiated and formed.

Latest elections

2022 parliamentary election

2022 presidential election

See also 
 Electoral calendar
 Electoral system

References

Further reading 
Toplak, Jurij. The parliamentary election in Slovenia, October 2004. Electoral Studies 25 (2006) 825–831.

External links 

Adam Carr's Election Archive
Parties and elections
 NSD: European Election Database - Slovenia publishes regional level election data; allows for comparisons of election results, 1992-2008